Adriano Leite Ribeiro (born February 17, 1982), commonly known simply as Adriano, is a Brazilian former professional footballer. He played as a striker and was known for his long range left footed strikes.

Adriano had four prolific seasons in Italy with Italian clubs Parma and Inter Milan, being considered one of the best strikers in the world during this time and earning the nickname "L'Imperatore (the Emperor)". Adriano finished within the top 10 of the Ballon d'Or in 2004 and 2005 and was awarded the IFFHS World's Top Goal Scorer of 2005. He was a key figure in Inter's 2005–06 Scudetti win before his career was, however, marked by inconsistency and a decline in his performances which coincided with the death of his father. He moved back to his native Brazil in 2009 and went on to win a Brasileirão with both Flamengo and Corinthians. He retired in 2016 at the age of 34.

Making his Brazil debut at 18, Adriano was considered the long-term successor to Ronaldo. In the absence of Ronaldo he led Brazil to the 2004 Copa América, receiving the Golden Boot as the competition's leading scorer with seven goals. He also won the 2005 FIFA Confederations Cup with Brazil, receiving the Golden Boot Award as the competition's leading scorer with five goals. Prior to the 2006 World Cup he was part of Brazil's much-vaunted "magic quartet" of offensive players alongside Ronaldo, Ronaldinho and Kaká, which ultimately was not successful at the finals.

Club career

Early career
Adriano started his career in 1999 on Flamengo's youth squad and earned promotion to the senior squad one year later. He made his team debut on 2 February 2000, a Torneio Rio-São Paulo match against Botafogo. He scored a goal against São Paulo in the same competition 4 days later.

Despite signing a two-year contract with Flamengo in June 2000, he secured a move to Inter Milan for the 2001–02 season. Inter sold another half of Vampeta to PSG (ultimately to Flamengo from PSG for undisclosed fee) for €9.757 million in exchange for Adriano who was valued €13.189 million. Adriano scored his first goal with the club against Real Madrid in a friendly match as a substitute.

Parma
Adriano was loaned to Fiorentina for the 2001–02 season, after which a two-year co-ownership deal with Parma was agreed, for €8.8 million, in order to acquire Fabio Cannavaro which also included another half of Matteo Ferrari for €5.7 million He formed an impressive striking duo with Adrian Mutu, scoring 22 goals in 36 appearances. He missed the month of November 2003 due to injury.

Return to Inter Milan
Adriano returned to the San Siro in January 2004 on a -year contract, for about €23.4 million and scored a total of 12 goals in the rest of 2003–04 season. From 11 July 2004 through 29 June 2005, Adriano was in peak form, scoring 42 goals in both domestic and international competitions. He was voted sixth for the 2004 FIFA World Player of the Year. In September 2005, Inter rewarded him for his efforts with an improved contract running until June 30, 2010.

Following the signing of the new deal, Adriano's future at Inter suffered due to poor performances, fueled by questions and speculation regarding his work ethic, which was called into question when he was twice caught partying at nightclubs during the 2006–07 campaign. Brazilian coach Dunga did not call Adriano up for a friendly against Ecuador on 10 October 2006, and called for him to "change his behavior" and "focus on football". On 18 February 2007, Adriano skipped a team practice due to effects from a lengthy celebration of his birthday the night before, which led to Inter manager Roberto Mancini benching him for the team's Champions League match against Valencia and subsequent Serie A fixture against Catania.

Loan to São Paulo

On November 16, 2007, Inter owner Massimo Moratti sent Adriano on unpaid leave to his native Brazil for the second time in eighteen months, where he attended São Paulo's training center, due to his poor physical condition and a past battle with alcoholism. Though his agent denied Adriano's desire to return to Brazilian club football, Adriano claimed he was willing to leave Inter in the January transfer window in search of regular playing time, with the Italian press stating interest from West Ham United and Manchester City. In December 2007, Manchester City owner Thaksin Shinawatra expressed interest in bringing Adriano to the club during the January transfer window, commenting,

Moratti, however, stated that Adriano would remain with Inter. "I would like him back here in January, as strong and as good as he was." On 10 December, Inter technical director Marco Branca said that Adriano was expected to rejoin the team at the start of the new year. "[The] news has been good. We intend to leave him in peace until the end of the programme and then he will be treated like the other players." Inter finalized a deal on 19 December to loan Adriano to São Paulo for the remainder of the 2007–08 season in order to allow him to compete in the 2008 Copa Libertadores. São Paulo fans were soon seen standing in long lines to buy his new number 10 jersey at the team's official merchandise retailer after Adriano was introduced and his shirt was unveiled at a team press conference. Adriano celebrated his competitive debut with São Paulo by scoring both goals in their 2–1 victory over Guaratinguetá on the opening day of the 2008 Paulista tournament.

He was sent off after headbutting Santos centre-back Domingos on 10 February 2008, and was suspended for two matches after initially risking a suspension of eighteen months. He was fined by São Paulo on 29 February for arriving 30 minutes late for training, then leaving early and exchanging words with a photographer. According to team sporting director Marco Aurélio Cunha, Adriano "left the training ground because he wanted to. The team does not miss him. If he is not happy at São Paulo, he is free to go." São Paulo sporting director Carlos Augusto de Barros e Silva announced on 17 June that Adriano was returning to Inter ahead of schedule. "We have a balanced squad and it was better for Adriano to go back, given that we won't be able to count on him for the rest of the campaign."

2008–09 season

Adriano was a regular goalscorer in the early stages of the 2008–09 Serie A campaign, reaching a combined total of 100 domestic goals in the Italian Serie A and the Brazilian Série A. On 22 October 2008, Adriano scored the winner in a 1–0 win over Anorthosis Famagusta, and, with this goal, Adriano scored his 18th Champions League goal, and 70th for the club.

In December, Inter Milan allowed him special dispensation to return to Brazil over the winter break earlier than planned. Inter confirmed on 4 April that Adriano had not returned from international duty with Brazil and had signed no contract with the club. On 24 April, Adriano finally rescinded his contract with Inter.

Second stint at Flamengo

Adriano signed a one-year contract for Brazilian club Flamengo on 6 May 2009, the club with which he started his career. On his debut after returning to Flamengo, played on 31 May 2009, he scored a goal against Atlético Paranaense. On 21 June 2009, he scored his first hat-trick for Flamengo in the 4–0 win over Internacional in the Brazilian Série A; his performances would be instrumental to lead Flamengo to their first Brazilian Serie A title since 1992.

On 31 January 2010, Adriano scored his second hat-trick since his return, this time in a 5–3 comeback win in the Fla-Flu derby against rivals Fluminense in the 2010 Rio de Janeiro State League.

Roma
On 8 June 2010, Italian Serie A club Roma announced that Adriano had signed a three-year contract with the club, effective on 1 July, earning a gross annual salary of €5M. He was then presented to the press with the no. 8 shirt. Roma terminated the contract on 8 March 2011, after seven months in the Italian capital.

Corinthians
On 25 March 2011, he signed a one-year deal with Corinthians. Adriano ruptured his Achilles tendon on 19 April, while he was training, after the surgery he spent six months recovering. After recovering, he played his first game for Corinthians on 9 October 2011, when his club beat Atlético Goianiense 3–0. His first goal for Corinthians came on 20 October in the home game versus Atlético Mineiro, and was the winning goal that made the game 2-1 and gave Corinthians a two-point lead in the Championship with only two games remaining. On 12 March 2012, Adriano was released by Corinthians, after his irregular appearances and lack of interest.

Third stint at Flamengo
On 21 August 2012 Adriano signed a contract with Flamengo. On 7 November 2012 he was released by Flamengo.

Atlético Paranaense
On 11 February 2014 the Brazilian striker signed a deal with Atlético Paranaense. On 11 April 2014 he was released by Atlético Paranaense.

Miami United and retirement
On 28 January 2016, Adriano signed a contract with Miami United of the National Premier Soccer League. On 28 May 2016 he left Miami United.

International career

Adriano made his international debut for Brazil in a World Cup qualifier against Colombia on 15 November 2000 at the age of 18. He was often considered as the long-term successor to Ronaldo. Adriano scored his first international goal on 11 June 2003 in a friendly against Nigeria. He was included in the Brazil team for 2003 FIFA Confederations Cup, and led Brazil's attack alongside Ronaldinho in the absence of Ronaldo. He appeared in all three matches and scored two goals as Brazil was eliminated in the group stage. He missed the 2004 CONMEBOL Men Pre-Olympic Tournament due to injury.

The following year, he was included in Brazil team for 2004 Copa América. Brazil won the cup and Adriano won the Golden Boot as the competition's leading scorer with seven goals. In the final match against Argentina, Adriano dramatically scored the equalizer in the 93rd minute. The match went on to penalties and Brazil finally won 4–2, with Adriano scoring his penalty. After the match, coach Carlos Alberto Parreira singled out Adriano as a very important factor in winning the title.

In 2005, Adriano once again had an impressive tournament with Brazil, this time in the 2005 FIFA Confederations Cup. Adriano was named Player of the Tournament and received the Golden Boot Award as the competition's leading scorer with five goals. In the final, he steered Brazil to victory, scoring two goals in a 4–1 victory over Argentina.

Adriano was called up for the 2006 FIFA World Cup, forming part of Brazil's highly publicized "magic quartet" of offensive players alongside Ronaldo, Ronaldinho and Kaká. He scored his first goal on 18 June 2006 in a 2–0 win against Australia and his second in a 3–0 victory against Ghana. Despite his two goals, Adriano's World Cup campaign was considered a disappointment, as he managed only five shots all tournament, while Brazil as a whole were unable to find the right mix between defence and attack, ultimately being eliminated in the quarter-finals by France.

After the disappointing World Cup, Adriano's international career declined due to a series of poor club performances and personal problems. Adriano has featured once for Brazil under Dunga's regime since the conclusion of the World Cup, as a halftime substitute during a 2–0 friendly loss to Portugal on 6 February 2007. In 2008, Adriano finally regained his form during his stint at São Paulo FC and earned a recall to the national team. On 10 October 2008, Adriano scored his first international goal in two years in a World Cup qualifier against Venezuela. He was a regular member of Brazil squad during World Cup qualification, and was brought for the team's last friendly prior to the 2010 FIFA World Cup against Republic of Ireland. However, Adriano was one of the two players dropped from the final 23-men squad by coach Dunga, along with Carlos Eduardo (who had replaced an injured Elano against Ireland). The backup of injured Luís Fabiano on the Ireland game, Grafite, instead occupied Adriano's place.  Adriano was also left out of the backup player list.

Style of play

Adriano was a well-rounded, versatile, and modern striker, who combined pace and physicality with nimble footwork and excellent technical skills; due to his dominance, power, and skill, he was nicknamed L'Imperatore ("The Emperor") after the famous Roman Emperor Hadrian, during his time in Italy. Adriano was a left-footed player, who was gifted with excellent ball control, dribbling ability, and creativity. He was also a strong forward, with an eye for goal, and an immensely powerful striker of the ball with his left foot, as well as was an accurate free-kick taker; he was also effective in the air, and had the ability to link-up with his teammates and provide assists. Regarded as a highly promising player in his youth, Adriano's qualities and playing style drew comparisons with that of compatriot Ronaldo, and he was even initially regarded as his potential successor in the media. Despite his natural talent, Adriano's consistency, character, fitness, and work-rate were brought into question after the death of his father; moreover, his struggles with depression and alcoholism, combined with his hedonistic and turbulent lifestyle off the pitch, as well as his personal troubles, injury struggles, and lack of discipline in training, also contributed to his significant weight gain as his career progressed. Due to his inconsistency in later years, he was widely regarded in the media for failing to live up to his initial potential. As such, although he was considered one of the best players in the world at his peak, Adriano is also a record three–time winner of the Bidone d'Oro Award, a prize is given to the worst Serie A player during a particular season, which he won in 2006 and 2007 with Inter, and in 2010 with Roma.

Personal life
In November 2014, a judge in Rio de Janeiro cleared Adriano of charges of drug trafficking which had first been alleged in 2010, due to a lack of sufficient evidence.

Career statistics

Club

International

Honours 

Flamengo
 Série A: 2009
 Campeonato Carioca: 2000, 2001

Inter Milan
 Serie A: 2005–06, 2006–07
 Coppa Italia: 2004–05, 2005–06
 Supercoppa Italiana: 2005, 2006

Corinthians
 Série A: 2011

Brazil U17
 FIFA U-17 World Cup: 1999

Brazil U20
 South American Youth Championship: 2001

Brazil
 FIFA Confederations Cup: 2005
 Copa América: 2004

Individual
 South American U-20 Championship Golden Shoe: 2001
 FIFA World Youth Championship Silver Shoe: 2001
 Ballon d'Or: 2004 (6th place), 2005 (7th place)
 FIFA World Player of the Year: 2004 (6th place), 2005 (5th place)
 Pirata d'Oro (Internazionale Player of the Year): 2004
 Copa América Golden Ball: 2004
 Copa América Golden Shoe: 2004
 Copa América Team of the Tournament: 2004
 FIFA Confederations Cup Golden Ball: 2005
 FIFA Confederations Cup Golden Shoe: 2005
 IFFHS World's Top Goal Scorer: 2005
 Campeonato Brasileiro Série A Team of the Year: 2009
 Campeonato Brasileiro Série A top goalscorer: 2009
 Bola de Ouro: 2009
 Bola de Prata: 2009

Footnotes

References

External links 

 Adriano at CBF 
 Adriano at Footballdatabase.com
 
 
 
 Adriano - Hero to Zero

1982 births
Living people
Expatriate footballers in Italy
Association football forwards
São Paulo FC players
CR Flamengo footballers
ACF Fiorentina players
Parma Calcio 1913 players
Inter Milan players
A.S. Roma players
Sport Club Corinthians Paulista players
Club Athletico Paranaense players
Campeonato Brasileiro Série A players
Serie A players
2006 FIFA World Cup players
2005 FIFA Confederations Cup players
2004 Copa América players
2003 FIFA Confederations Cup players
FIFA Confederations Cup-winning players
Copa América-winning players
Brazil under-20 international footballers
Brazil international footballers
Brazilian expatriate footballers
Footballers from Rio de Janeiro (city)
Brazilian footballers
Brazilian expatriate sportspeople in Italy
National Premier Soccer League players